SIL International (formerly known as the Summer Institute of Linguistics) is an evangelical Christian non-profit organization whose main purpose is to study, develop and document languages, especially those that are lesser-known, in order to expand linguistic knowledge, promote literacy, translate the Christian Bible into local languages, and aid minority language development.

Based on its language documentation work, SIL publishes a database, Ethnologue, of its research into the world's languages, and develops and publishes software programs for language documentation, such as FieldWorks Language Explorer (FLEx) and Lexique Pro.

Its main offices in the United States are located at the International Linguistics Center in Dallas, Texas.

History 
William Cameron Townsend, a Presbyterian minister, founded the organization in 1934, after undertaking a Christian mission with the Disciples of Christ among the Kaqchikel Maya people in Guatemala in the early 1930s. In 1933, he turned to Mexico with the purpose of translating the Bible into indigenous languages there, as he had done for Kaqchikel. Townsend established a working relationship with the Mexican  Secretariat of Public Education under the government of President Lázaro Cárdenas (in office 1934–1940) and founded SIL to educate linguist-missionaries to work in Mexico. Because the Mexican government did not allow missionary work through its educational system, Townsend founded Wycliffe Bible Translators in 1942 as a separate organization from SIL. Wycliffe Bible Translators focused on Bible translation and missionary activities, whereas SIL focused on linguistic documentation and literacy education.

Having initiated collaboration with the Mexican education authorities, Townsend started the institute as a small summer training-session in Sulphur Springs, Arkansas, in 1934 to train missionaries in basic linguistic,  anthropological, and translation principles.  Through the following decades the SIL linguists worked at providing literacy education to indigenous people of Mexico, while simultaneously working with the Wycliffe Bible Translators on Bible translation.  One of the students at the first summer institute in its second year, 1935, Kenneth Lee Pike (1912–2000), would become the foremost figure in the history of SIL.  He served as SIL's president from 1942 to 1979, then as president emeritus until his death in 2000.

In 2016, Dr. Michel Kenmogne from Cameroon became president.

 SIL said it had 1,350 language projects in 98 countries and 4,200 employees from 84 countries.

Contributions 
SIL's principal contribution to linguistics has been the data that have been gathered and analyzed from over 1,000 minority and endangered languages, many of which had not been previously studied academically. SIL endeavors to share both the data and the results of analysis in order to contribute to the overall knowledge of language. This has resulted in publications on languages such as Hixkaryana and Pirahã, which have challenged the universality of some linguistic theories. SIL's work has resulted in over 20,000 technical publications, all of which are listed in the SIL Bibliography.  Most of these are a reflection of linguistic fieldwork.

SIL's focus has not been on the development of new linguistic theories, but tagmemics, though no longer promoted by SIL, was developed by Kenneth Pike, who also coined the words emic and etic, more widely used today in anthropology.

Another focus of SIL is literacy work, particularly in indigenous languages. SIL assists local, regional, and national agencies that are developing formal and informal education in vernacular languages. These cooperative efforts enable new advances in the complex field of educational development in multilingual and multicultural societies.

SIL provides instructors and instructional materials for linguistics programs at several major institutions of higher learning around the world. In the United States, these include Dallas International University, Biola University, Moody Bible Institute, and Dallas Theological Seminary. Other universities with SIL programs include Trinity Western University in Canada, Charles Darwin University in Australia, and Universidad Ricardo Palma in Lima, Peru.

The organization has recently established a new Language and Culture Documentation Services Unit that aims to preserve and revitalize languages threatened by extinction. The creation of this department reflects a growing interest in documenting endangered languages and incorporates a multidisciplinary approach of anthropology and linguistics.

Affiliations 
SIL has Consultative Status with UNESCO as an NGO, and has Special Consultative Status with the United Nations Economic and Social Council (ECOSOC) as an advocate for ethnolinguistic communities.

The organization is a member of the Forum of Bible Agencies International and Micah Network, and is a founding member of Maaya, the World Network for Linguistic Diversity.

Methodological contributions

Ethnologue and ISO 639-3 codes 

Ethnologue: A Guide to the World's Languages, is published by SIL, since 1951. Starting with the 16th edition in 2009, Ethnologue uses the ISO 639-3 standard, which assigns 3-letter codes to languages; these were derived in part from the 3-letter codes that were used in the Ethnologue's 15th edition. SIL is the registration authority for the ISO 639-3 standard. The 15th edition, which was published in 2005, includes 7,299 codes. A 16th edition was released in the middle of 2009, a 17th in 2013, and an 18th in 2015. The 25th edition was released in 2022.

Software 
SIL has developed widely used software for linguistic research. Adapt It is a tool for translating text from one language into a related language after performing limited linguistic analysis. In the field of lexicon collection, ShoeBox, the newer ToolBox (Field Linguist's Toolbox), and Lexique Pro have largely been replaced by FieldWorks Language Explorer (FLEx Windows and Linux) for linguists and WeSay (also Windows and Linux) for non-professionals. Graphite is a smart-font technology and rendering system. Keyman is keyboard software solution for typing over 2000 of the world's languages as well as the ability to make custom keyboards.

Fonts 
SIL has developed several widely used font sets that it makes available as free software under the SIL Open Font License (OFL). The names of SIL fonts reflect the Biblical mission of the organization "charis" (Greek for "grace"), "doulos" (Greek for "servant") and "gentium" (Latin for "of the nations"). These fonts have become standard resources for linguists working on the documentation of the world's languages. Most of them are designed only for specific writing systems, such as Ethiopic, Devanagari, New Tai Lue, Hebrew, Arabic, Khmer, Yi, Myanmar, Coptic, and Tai Viet, or some more technical notation, such as cipher musical notation or IPA. Fonts that support Latin include:
 Gentium: "a typeface family designed to enable the diverse ethnic groups around the world who use the Latin, Cyrillic and Greek scripts to produce readable, high-quality publications. It supports a wide range of Latin- and Cyrillic-based alphabets."
 Doulos SIL: "a Unicode serif font similar in design to Times/Times New Roman. It contains a comprehensive inventory of glyphs needed for almost any Roman- or Cyrillic-based writing system, whether used for phonetic or orthographic needs. In addition, there is provision for other characters and symbols useful to linguists. It contains near-complete coverage of all the characters defined in Unicode 7.0 for Latin and Cyrillic."
Charis SIL: "a Unicode-based font family that supports the wide range of languages that use the Latin and Cyrillic scripts. It is specially designed to make long texts pleasant and easy to read, even in less than ideal reproduction and display environments."
 Andika: "a sans serif Unicode font designed especially for literacy use and the needs of beginning readers. The focus is on clear letterforms that will not be easily confused with one another. It supports near-complete coverage for Latin and Cyrillic."

Recognitions 
The 1947 Summer Meeting of the Linguistic Society of America passed a resolution that the work of SIL "should be strongly commended by our Society and welcomed as one of the most promising developments in applied linguistics in this country."

SIL holds formal consultative status with UNESCO and the United Nations, and has been publicly recognized by UNESCO for their work in many parts of Asia. SIL also holds non-governmental organization status in many countries.

SIL's work has received appreciation and recognition in a number of international settings. In 1973, SIL was awarded the Ramon Magsaysay Award for International Understanding. This foundation honors outstanding individuals and organizations working in Asia who manifest greatness of spirit in service to the peoples of Asia.  UNESCO Literacy Prizes have been awarded to SIL's work in a number of countries: Australia (1969), Cameroon (1986), Papua New Guinea (1979), Philippines (1991).

Criticism
In 1979, SIL's agreement was officially terminated by the Mexican government after critiques from anthropologists regarding the combination of education and missionary activities in indigenous communities, though SIL continued to be active in that country.  At a conference of the Inter-American Indian Institute in Mérida, Yucatán, in November 1980, delegates denounced the Summer Institute of Linguistics, charging that it was using a scientific name to conceal its Protestant agenda and an alleged capitalist view that was alien to indigenous traditions. This led to the agreement with the Ecuadoran government being terminated in 1980, although a token presence remained.  In the early 1990s, the Confederation of Indigenous Nationalities of Ecuador (CONAIE) demanded the expulsion of SIL from the country.  SIL was also expelled from Brazil, Mexico, and Panama, and restricted in Colombia and Peru.

The organization's focus on language description, language development and Bible translation, and the missionary activities carried out by many of its field workers have been criticized by linguists and anthropologists who argue that SIL aims to change indigenous cultures, which exacerbates the problems that cause language endangerment and language death. Linguists have argued that the missionary focus of SIL makes relations with academic linguists and their reliance on SIL software and knowledge infrastructure problematic in that respective goals, while often overlapping, also sometimes diverge considerably.

SIL does not consider efforts to change cultural patterns a form of culture destruction and points out that all their work is based on the voluntary participation of indigenous peoples. In the SIL view, ethnocide is not a valid concept and it would lead to pessimism to characterize culture change resulting from the inevitable progress of civilization as ethnocide. SIL considers itself as actively protecting endangered languages by promoting them within the speech community and providing mother-tongue literacy training. Additionally, their expanded interest in preserving threatened languages has resulted in the creation of a Language and Culture Documentation Services Unit.

Regional offices 
Besides  the headquarters in Dallas, SIL has offices and locally incorporated affiliated organizations in the following countries:

Africa
Cameroon: Yaoundé (central office), Bamenda (regional office), Maroua (regional bureau for the north of the country)
Chad: N'Djaména
Ethiopia: Addis Ababa
Senegal: Dakar (central office), Ziguinchor (regional office), Thies (regional office)
Togo: Lomé
Kenya: Nairobi (Africa Regional Office)
Nigeria: Jos

Americas
Brazil: Cuiabá
Colombia (1962–2002)
Mexico: Instituto Lingüístico de Verano (Mexico), based in the Tlalpan borough of Mexico City
Peru: Instituto Lingüístico de Verano (Peru), based in Lima
Suriname (1968–2001)

Asia
Philippines: Quezon City

Oceania 
 Australia: Kangaroo Ground (Melbourne suburbs)
 Papua New Guinea: Ukarumpa

See also 
 ISO 639-3
 JAARS

References

Citations

Sources 

 .
 .
 .
 .
 .
   This book contains allegations of Rockefeller's use of American missionaries, and in particular, the Summer Institute of Linguistics, who cooperated in conducting surveys, transporting CIA agents and indirectly assisting in the genocide of tribes in the Amazon basin.
 .
 .
 .
 
 .
 
  This article describes SIL's collaboration with US oil corporations and military governments in South America in the 1950s and 1960s.
 
 
 .
 . This report in Spanish contains a detailed chart of SIL activities in Latin American countries.
 
 . The author presents a discourse analysis of the practices of SIL.
 .  Contains references to alleged SIL missionary activities and displacement of indigenous peoples in South America.
 .
  Criticism of alleged SIL missionary activities.
 .
 .

External links 
 

Christian missions
Evangelical parachurch organizations
Christian organizations established in 1934
Christianity-related controversies
Religious organizations based in the United States
Linguistic research institutes
+
Organizations based in Dallas